Wilhelm Junk (3 February 1866, Prague – 3 December 1942, The Hague) was a noted Czech antiquarian bookseller in the field of natural history, and an entomologist.

Wilhelm Junk established his book dealership  "Antiquariaat Junk", in 1899 in Berlin. He soon became the leading dealer in works on natural history in Europe. Junk also edited and published reference works, notably Lepidopterorum Catalogus edited by Embrik Strand, and Coleopterorum Catalogus edited by Junk himself and Sigmund Schenkling. A Jewish refugee, he moved his shop to The Hague in the 1930s. He sold his business to Rudolph Schierenberg in 1935.  It still operates as "Antiquariaat Junk".

He was a Doctor of Philosophy honoris causae, an honour conferred by the Humboldt University of Berlin.

Works
Incomplete list
 Rara Historico Naturalia Berlin (1900-1939). The first  bibliographical reference work for natural history giving detailed bibliographical, historical, and scientific information.
Bibliographia botanica W. Junk, Berlin (1909-1916).
Schnörkel um Bücher respective naturwissenschaftliche Kinkerlitzchen an‘s Licht gebracht vom Doctor Junk Berlin (1930).

See also
Mycopathologia

Further reading

References
 Anonym 1936 [Junk, W.]  Boll. Soc. Ent. Ital. 68 33. 
 Reitter, E. 1936 [Junk, W.] Zum 70. Geburtstag. Ent. Nachrichtenblatt 10 148-149.  
 Riley, N. D. 1944 Entomologist 77 96. 
 Riley, N. D. 1944 [Junk, W.] Proc. R. Ent. Soc. London (C) 9(5) 19.

External links
 

German entomologists
Booksellers (people)
1866 births
1942 deaths